The 2017 Bayamon Cup is the seventh edition of the Bayamon City Cup, a cup tournament for clubs in Puerto Rico organized by Bayamón FC.

Teams
The tournament was open to all league clubs from Puerto Rico, most clubs used this competition as preseason for the start of 2017 season.

North American Soccer League (1 team)
Puerto Rico FC

Liga Atlética Interuniversitaria (LAI)(2 teams)
UPR Mayaguez - Colegio
Universidad del Turabo

Puerto Rico Soccer League (7 teams)
Bayamon FC 
CD Barbosa
Fraigcomar FC 
Guayama FC
GPS Puerto Rico
Leal Arecibo FC  
Metropolitan FA

Schedule

First round
In the first round, the 10 teams were divided into 2 groups of five teams. Each group is played on a round-robin basis, hosted at the Bayamon Soccer Complex. The top two teams from each group will progress to the semifinal round. The two winners will face each other in the final on March 11.

Group A

Matches

Group B

Matches

Note: Some games were played out of order due to conflicts with the scheduling.

Semi-final round

Matches

Final round
The format of the final round have not been announced.

Qualified teams
Bayamon FC
Puerto Rico FC

Host venue: Bayamon Soccer Complex, Bayamon, Puerto Rico (all times UTC−4)

Matches

Top scorers

Players and clubs in bold still active in competition.

References

Football competitions in Puerto Rico
2017 domestic association football cups
2017–18 in Caribbean football leagues
2017 in Puerto Rican football
February 2017 sports events in the United States
March 2017 sports events in the United States